Louis Bessems (born 25 September 1892, date of death unknown) was a Belgian footballer. He played in 13 matches for the Belgium national football team from 1913 to 1923.

References

External links
 

1892 births
Year of death missing
Belgian footballers
Belgium international footballers
Place of birth missing
Association football midfielders